Rodrigo Faustino (born 6 January 1987) is a Brazilian field hockey player. He competed in the men's field hockey tournament at the 2016 Summer Olympics.

References

1987 births
Living people
Brazilian male field hockey players
Olympic field hockey players of Brazil
Field hockey players at the 2016 Summer Olympics
Place of birth missing (living people)
Field hockey players at the 2015 Pan American Games
Pan American Games competitors for Brazil
21st-century Brazilian people